Michał Mieczysław Wojciech Gutowski (14 September 1910 – 23 August 2006) was a Brigadier General of the Polish Army and an equestrian. He competed in two events at the 1936 Summer Olympics.

Gutowski was a career officer of the Polish Army. He fought in the September Campaign of World War II. After the Polish defeat he joined the Polish Armed Forces in the West in France and eventually in Britain. He fought in the 1st Armoured Division under General Stanisław Maczek, among others in the Battle of Falaise.

After the war he emigrated to Canada where he worked as a military instructor for Canadian forces. He later established an equestrian club and trained Canadian equestrian riders.

Gutowski was awarded multiple state and military awards, among others Virtuti Militari, Order of Polonia Restituta or Légion d'honneur. He was buried at the Powązki Military Cemetery in Warsaw.

References

1910 births
2006 deaths
Polish male equestrians
Olympic equestrians of Poland
Equestrians at the 1936 Summer Olympics
People from Sieradz County
Polish Army officers
Polish emigrants to Canada
Recipients of the Order of Polonia Restituta
Recipients of the Silver Cross of the Virtuti Militari
Recipients of the Cross of Valour (Poland)
Chevaliers of the Légion d'honneur
Recipients of the Croix de Guerre (France)
Recipients of the Legion of Merit
Burials at Powązki Military Cemetery